Alangalang (IPA: [ʔɐlɐŋ'ʔalɐŋ]), officially the Municipality of Alangalang, is a 2nd class municipality in the province of Leyte, Philippines. According to the 2020 census, it has a population of 57,185 people.

It is a landlocked town with an area of 151 km2. It is bounded on the north by Barugo and San Miguel, on the south by Pastrana, on the north-east by Tacloban City, on the east by Santa Fe and on the west by Jaro.

On the way to Carigara is a steel bridge spanning the Mainit River. There was a time when only footpaths existed and the river was far too wide for a leap and too deep to wade in, travelers were undecided what to do. Hence the name Alangalang was given to the town, from the vernacular word alang-alang which means "indecision".

The strongest tropical typhoon Haiyan, more commonly known as Typhoon Yolanda impacted the town on November 8, 2013.

History

The town began to form from different "rancherías" and "barangays" at about the year 1596, Fr. Cosme de Flores, a priest-engineer, made it into the fourth "doctrina." Fr. Tomas de Montaya, a Manila college professor succeeded Fr. Flores who died at the early age of 29. Alangalang, with Dulag, was made a "cabecera" of nine towns with Fr. Mateo Sanchez as superior.

In 1600, the town suffered from the Moro raids. A punitive force from Cebu under Capitan Francisco de Pedraza was sent to suppress lawlessness. In 1611, a hurricane swept the whole town and floods became frequent. The 18 or 20 rancherias declined in importance and around December 1628, Alangalang became a "visita" of Barugo.

The old town of Alangalang was founded in 1748 in a site located across the steel bridge at Binongto-an called Bukid Height. This settlement was headed by Francisco Antonis, a courageous leader, together with Pongal, Manamot, Francisco Gariando, Hidalgo Pedrera and Solang Adlao. Antonis was famed for having eaten the liver of a Moro bandit whom he caught during one of the raids. Fr. Baysa, a Franciscan, was then their spiritual mentor. The objective of the Moro raids was the gold church bell. During every Moro attack, the inhabitants would take the gold bell with them to the hills. At one time, when the townsfolk were being pursued, they had to drop the gold bell in the Bangka River only to save it from the invaders, the bell has never been recovered since then.

Alangalang was made into a parish in 1809 according to a historian named Cousin. Towards the end of the 18th century, the settlement in Bukid thrived that Fr. Jose Olmo, then Parish priest, transferred the town across the Mainit River where the provincial nursery is located up to this day. The government officials at that time were the gobernadorcillo, teniente mayor, teniente segundo, cabeza de la barangay or guinhaopan, delgado de las rentas and cuadrilleros. Among the lay leaders were Eulogio Barrantes, Santo Pabilona, Eulogio Daroles and Esteban Pedero. By the middle of the 19th century, Alangalang had a rectory and six rural schools; the roads to Palo and Barugo were also opened. The town was noted for its abacá, copra, seeds of "kabalonga", wax, cocoa, tobacco and rice.

A big flood leveled the town in 1883. By November of the same year, the gobernadorcillo moved the town to its present site. In 1892, when there was a rebellion in the country, Alangalang was in the middle of the fight. Leocardio Pabilona overthrew the Spanish rule in the town and became the jefe or capitán with a new set of guinhaopan. When the Americans occupied the town upon orders from Pabilona, the inhabitants evacuated the place. The Americans, angered, set the town on fire. It was the hardship of mountain life which finally made the townsfolk yield to American authority.

From then on, the town's growth was steady. Alangalang is a big producer of copra and rice and lies along the route of the busiest national highway of the province. The town has one of the biggest Spanish-made churches and shortly before the war had a new concrete municipal building with a swimming pool.

After the fall of Corregidor in May 1942, the municipality became the emergency capital of the province. Provincial and national offices and government records were accordingly transferred there for safekeeping. On December 16, 1942, Japanese planes bombed the town. Alangalang again became one of the bulwarks of the resistance movement with Filemon Pabilona and Elias Macina as leaders. In 1944 to 1945, the Filipino forces of the 4th, 9th, 92nd, 93rd and 95th Infantry Division of the Philippine Commonwealth Army took in the town in Alangalang, Leyte fought the battles against the Japanese forces in World War II. After liberation, a regional high school opened. The town continues to lead in agriculture.

Geography

Barangays

Alangalang is politically subdivided into 54 barangays.

Climate

Demographics

Economy

Education
There are a total of 49 Elementary Schools, 5 High Schools and 1 University in Alangalang

Elementary/Grade School

High School/Secondary 
 Alangalang National High School
 Astorga National High School
 Alangalang Night High School
 Borseth National High School
 Ana G. Yu National High School
 Mariano Salazar National High School

College/Universities 
 Visayas State University - Alangalang Campus

See also 

 List of reduplicated place names

References

External links

 [ Philippine Standard Geographic Code]
Philippine Census Information
Barangay Pepita People's Learning Center
Local Governance Performance Management System 

Municipalities of Leyte (province)